"Satumaa-tango" (in English, "Satumaa Tango") is a song by Finnish pop rock singer-songwriter Maija Vilkkumaa. Released by Warner Music Finland in 1999 as the debut single from her debut album Pitkä ihana leikki, the song is written by Vilkkumaa. The song peaked at number seven on its debut week on the Finnish Singles Chart and charted five weeks later at number nine.

Track listing

References

1999 debut singles
Maija Vilkkumaa songs
Finnish-language songs
Songs written by Maija Vilkkumaa
1999 songs